Edda Ferronao is an Italian former stage, film and television actress.

Selected filmography
 March's Child (1957)
 Toto, Peppino and the Fanatics (1958)
 The Conqueror of the Orient (1960)
 Fountain of Trevi (1960)
 Vulcan, Son of Giove (1962)
 Slaughter of the Vampires (1962)
 Il Sorpasso (1962)
 The Organizer (1963)
 Desert Raiders (1964)
 The Magnificent Cuckold (1964)
 Let's Talk About Women (1964)
 The Libertine (1968)
 Madame Bovary (1969)
 Brancaleone at the Crusades (1970)
 Una cavalla tutta nuda (1972)
 The Mattei Affair (1972)
 The Devil Is a Woman (1974)

References

Bibliography
 Bayman, Louis. Directory of World Cinema: Italy. Intellect Books, 2011.

External links

1934 births
Living people
Italian film actresses
Italian television actresses
Italian stage actresses
Actors from Verona